The Humanitarian Award (formerly the Allan Waters Humanitarian Award) is awarded by the Canadian Academy of Recording Arts and Sciences (CARAS) to Canadian musicians who have made significant humanitarian efforts. Since 2006, it is given annually every Juno Awards ceremony.

Waters, whose name was attached to the award until 2017, was one of the founders of CHUM Limited. His name was removed from the award title effective with the 2018 Juno Awards.

Recipients
 2006 - Bruce Cockburn
 2007 - Tom Jackson
 2008 - Paul Brandt
 2009 - Sarah McLachlan
 2010 - Bryan Adams
 2011 - Neil Young
 2012 - Simple Plan
 2013 - Tom Cochrane
 2014 - Chantal Kreviazuk and Raine Maida
 2015 - Rush
 2016 - Arcade Fire
 2017 - Buffy Sainte-Marie
 2018 - Gary Slaight
 2019 - David Foster
 2020 - not presented
 2021 - The Tragically Hip
 2022 - Susan Aglukark

See also

Music of Canada

References 

Awards established in 2006
Canadian music awards
Humanitarian and service awards